Maranboy was a tin mine near Barunga, about 70 kilometres east of Katherine in the Northern Territory of Australia.

Establishment

Aboriginal people such as the Jawoyn have lived in the area surrounding Maranboy for thousands of years. At the time of European settlement in 1869 at Palmerston, now Darwin, many of the country's other mineral resources had already been exploited. Therefore, new mining opportunities accelerated development in the north.

Alluvial tin was found in the area by Tim O'Shea in 1910, a stockman from Pine Creek, but he never registered a claim. In September 1913, Maranboy was declared as a goldfield for a period of two years.

Tin was discovered at Maranboy in 1913 by prospectors Scharber and Richardson. Tin mines and a battery were operational in the same year.

By 1918 the price of tin was booming.

The battery closed in 1949 for repairs but never reopened.

Workers

Prospectors of European, Chinese and Aboriginal descent worked at Maranboy. The most notable of them was Harold Snell, who later built many significant buildings in Darwin. The battery closed in 1949 for repairs but never reopened. Many of the Aboriginal people who serviced the mine returned to Beswick Creek (later Barunga).

References

Tin mines in Australia
Katherine Region